Yakuts or Sakha are a Turkic ethnic group who mainly live in the Republic of Sakha in the Russian Federation, with some extending to the Amur, Magadan, Sakhalin regions, and the Taymyr and Evenk Districts of the Krasnoyarsk region. The Yakut language belongs to the Siberian branch of the Turkic languages.

Etymology
According to Kulakovskiĭ, the Russian word  was taken from Evenk  , but the Russian word is actually a corruption from the Tungusic form. All of these are derived from a word related to Turkish yaka (geographical edge, collar) referring to the Yakuts' remote position in Siberia.

Origin

Early scholarship
An early work on the Yakut ethnogenesis was drafted by the Russian Collegiate Assessors I. Evers and S. Gornovsky in the late 18th century. At an unspecified time in the past certain tribes resided around the western shore of the Aral Sea. These peoples later migrated eastward and settled near the Tunka Goltsy mountains of modern Buryatia. Pressure from the expansionist Mongolian Empire later made many of those around the Tunka Goltsy relocate to the Lena River. Several additional Altai-Sayan region tribes later arrived on the Lena to flee from the Mongols. The subsequent cultural melding that occurred between these incoming migrants eventually created the Yakuts. The Sagay Khakas of Abakan River were presented as the origin of the ethnonym Sakha by Evers and Gornovsky.

In the mid-19th century Nikolai S. Schukin wrote "A Trip to Yakutsk” based on his experiences visiting the area. He presented a somewhat different origin of the Yakuts based upon local oral histories. Groups of Khakas inhabiting the southern Yenisey watershed migrated north to the Nizhnyaya Tunguska River to the Lena Plateau and finally onward to the Lena River. Schukin is credited as introducing the concept of Yenisey Khakas as the ancestors of the Yakut into Russian historiography. The most authoritative account in support of the Yenisey origin hypothesis was written by Nikolai N. Kozmin in 1928. He concluded that some Khakas moved from the Yenisey to the Angara River due to difficulties in the regional economy. In the 12th century Buryats arrived at Lake Baikal and through military force pushed the Khakas to the Lena.

Lake Baikal
In 1893 Turkologist scholar Vasily Radlov connected the Kurykans or Gǔlìgān Tiele people from Chinese historical accounts with the Yakuts. They are mentioned as 7th century tributaries of the Tang Dynasty, reportedly living on the Angara and around Lake Baikal. Radlov hypothesized they were a mixture of Tungusic and Uyghur peoples and the forebears of the Yakut.

Khoro
The Khoro (Khorin, Khorolors) Yakut maintain their progenitor was Uluu Khoro, rather than Omogoy or Ellei. Scholarship has not definitively established their ancestral ethnic affiliations. Their homeland was somewhere in the south and called Khoro sire. When the Khorolors arrived in the Middle Lena remains uncertain, with scholars estimating from the first millennium to the 16th century CE.

Among scholars a commonly accepted hypothesis is that the Khoro Yakut originate from the Khori Buryat of Lake Baikal, and therefore spoke a Turko-Mongolic language. This is largely based on their similar ethnonyms. Proponents see the word Khoro as arising from the Tibetan word hor. For example, according to G. N. Runyanstev, during the 6th through 10th centuries CE the inhabitants of Lake Baikal were called Chor. 
Okladnikov guessed that Khoro sire was near China and adjacent to the X.

This premise is not universally accepted and has been challenged by some researchers. George de Roerich has argued that the word is based on the Chinese word hu, a term used as general reference by the Chinese to refer to various Iranian or Turkic-Mongolian peoples of Central Asia. In contemporary Tibetan hor is used to describe any pastoralist "nomad of mixed origin" regardless of their ethnonym. After researching their origins, Ksenofontov concluded that while the Khorolors were "formed from parts of some alien tribe that mixed with the Yakuts", there was no compelling evidence connecting them with the Khori Buryat.

A more recent argument by Zoriktuev proposes that the Khorolors were originally Paleo-Asians from the Lower Amur River. In contrast to their Yakut relatives, Khoro folklore focuses largely on the Raven, with some tales about the Eagle as well. In the mid 18th century Lindenau noted the Khorolors focused their religious devotion on the Raven, who was alternatively referred to as “Our ancestor”, "Our deity", and “Our grandfather" by the Khorolors. This reverence arises from the Raven enabling a struggling human (either the first Khoro man or his mother) to survive by giving a flint and tinder box. Their mythos is similar to cultures from both sides of the Bering Sea; the Haida, Tlingit, Tshisham of the North American Pacific Northwest Coast and the Paleoasians of the Siberian Coast like the Chukchi, Itelmen, and Koryaks all share reverence for the Raven.

Autochthonous ancestry
Many researchers have concluded that the Yakut ethnogenesis was an admixture of Turko-Mongols migrating from Lake-Baikal and native Yukaghir and Tungusitic peoples residing around the Lena River. Okladnikov detailed this conceived admixture process as the following:"...the Turkic-speaking ancestors of the Yakuts not only pushed out the aborigines but also subjected them to their influence by peaceful means; they assimilated and absorbed them into their mass... With this, the local tribes lost the former ethnic name and a proper ethnic consciousness, no longer separating themselves from the mass of Yakuts, and [were] not opposed to them... Consequently, as a result of the mixing with Northern aborigines, the southern ancestors of the Yakuts supplemented their culture and language with new features distinguishing them from other steppe tribes."

In 1996 Aleksei N. Alekseev and S. I. Nikolaeva-Somogotto alternatively proposed that Paleo-Asian and Samoyedic peoples populations instead intermarried with the incoming Turko-Mongols, for which there is some evidence.

Traditional Yakut histories contain stories of the aboriginal peoples of Yakutia. From the subarctic Bulunsky and Verkhoyansky Districts accounts state that the Black Yukaghir (Yakut: хара дъукаагырдар) descended from migrants pushed north from the Lena River. Related stories recorded in Ust'-Aldanskiy Ulus and Megino-Kangalassky District mention certain tribes leaving the region due to rising pressure from the incoming Yakuts. While some remained and intermarried with the newcomer, most went to the northern tundra.

Ymyyakhtakh
The Ymyyakhtakh are an ancient people of the Lena River. A burial ground was excavated and anthropologists I.I. Gokhman and L.F. Tomtosova studied the human remains and published their results in 1992. They concluded that some of the Late Neolithic population took part in the formation of the modern Yakuts. The consistency of related artistic embellishments on the traditional clothing of the Buryat, Samoyed, and Yakut led one scholar to conclude they are related. Toponymic data of Yakutia indicates there was once a presence of Paleoasian and Samoyed habitation in the region. Vilyui Tumats reportedly practiced anthropophagy and seen as an "ethnocultural marker" of the Samoyedic peoples.

Tumats
The Tumat stand out in Yakut tradition as a numerous and powerful society, with constant conflict once happening with them on the Vilyuy River. Their households were semi-subterranean with sod roofing and are comparable to traditional Samoyed dwellings. The term Doubo was used in medieval Chinese historical works in reference to the Sayano-Altai forest peoples. Vasily Radlov concluded that Doubo referred to the Samoyedic peoples. Doubo is additionally seen as the origin of the ethnonym "Tumat" by L. P. Potapov.

The Yakuts called the Tumat people "Dyirikinei" or "chipmunk people" (Yakut: Sдьирикинэй), arising from the Tumatian "tail-coat." Bundles of deer fur were dyed with red ocher and sewn into Tumatian jackets as adornments. Tumat hats were likewise dyed red. This style was likely spread by the Tumatians to some Tungusic peoples. Similar clothing has been reported during the 17th century for the Evenks on the upper Angara and for Evens residing on the lower Kolyma in the early 19th century. Additionally there are many similarities between the clothing of the Tumats and Altaic cultures. Archeological work on Pazyryk culture sites have turned up both hats dyed red and tail-coats made of sables. While the "tails" were not dyed red, they were sewn with red dyed thread. Stylistic and design choices are also comparable to traditional Khakas and Kumandin clothing. 

Some peaceable interactions including intermarriage did occur with the Tumats. One such example is the life of Džaardaakh, a Tumatian woman. She was renowned for her physical strength and martial repute as an archer. However Džaardaakh eventually married a Yakut man and is considered a notable ancestor of the local Vilyuy Yakut. The origin of her name has been linked to a Yukaghir word for ice (Yukaghir: йархан).

The ancestors of Yakuts were Kurykans who migrated from Yenisey river to Lake Baikal and were subject to a certain Mongolian admixture prior to migration in the 7th century. The Yakuts originally lived around Olkhon and the region of Lake Baikal. Beginning in the 13th century they migrated to the basins of the Middle Lena, the Aldan and Vilyuy rivers under the pressure of the rising Mongols. The northern Yakuts were largely hunters, fishermen and reindeer herders, while the southern Yakuts raised cattle and horses.

History

Imperial Russia
In the 1620s the Tsardom of Muscovy began to move into their territory and annexed or settled down on it, imposed a fur tax and managed to suppress several Yakut rebellions between 1634 and 1642. The tsarist brutality in collection of the pelt tax (yasak) sparked a rebellion and aggression among the Yakuts and also Tungusic-speaking tribes along the River Lena in 1642. The voivode Peter Golovin, leader of the tsarist forces, responded with a reign of terror: native settlements were torched and hundreds of people were killed. The Yakut population alone is estimated to have fallen by 70 percent between 1642 and 1682, mainly because of smallpox and other infectious diseases.

In the 18th century the Russians reduced the pressure, gave Yakut chiefs some privileges, granted freedom for all habitats, gave them all their lands, sent Eastern Orthodox missions, and educated the Yakut people regarding agriculture. The discovery of gold and, later, the building of the Trans-Siberian Railway, brought ever-increasing numbers of Russians into the region. By the 1820s almost all the Yakuts claimed to have converted to the Russian Orthodox church, but they retained (and still retain) a number of shamanist practices. Yakut literature began to rise in the late 19th century, and a national revival occurred in the early 20th century.

Russian Civil War
The last conflict of the Russian Civil War, known as the Yakut Revolt, occurred here when Cornet Mikhail Korobeinikov, a White Russian officer, led an uprising and a last stand against the Red Army.

Soviet Union
In 1922, the new Soviet government named the area the Yakut Autonomous Soviet Socialist Republic. In the late 1920s through the late 1930s, Yakut people were systematically persecuted, when Joseph Stalin launched his collectivization campaign. It is possible that hunger and malnutrition during this period resulted in a decline in the Yakut total population from 240,500 in 1926 to 236,700 in 1959. By 1972, the population began to recover.

Russian Federation

Currently, Yakuts form a large plurality of the total population within the vast Sakha Republic. According to the 2010 Russian census, there were a total of 466,492 Yakuts residing in the Sakha Republic during that year, or 49.9% of the total population of the Republic.

Culture
 

Certain rock formations named Kigilyakh, as well as places such as Ynnakh Mountain, are held in high esteem by Yakuts.

Cuisine

This cuisine is only used in Yakutia.

Language

According to the 2010 census, some 87% of the Yakuts in the Sakha Republic are fluent in the Yakut (or Sakha) language, while 90% are fluent in Russian. The Sakha/Yakut language belongs to the Northern branch of the Siberian Turkic languages. It is most closely related to the Dolgan language, and also to a lesser extent related to Tuvan and Shor.

DNA and genetics analysis 
The primary Y-chromosome DNA haplogroup for the Yakut is N-M231. While found in around 89% of the general population, in northern Yakutia it is closer to 71%. N-M231 is shared with various other Eastern Siberian populations. The remaining haplogroups are approximately: 4% C-M217 (including subclades C-M48 and C-M407), 3.5% R1a-M17 (including subclade R1a-M458), and 2.1% N-P43, with sporadic instances of I-M253, R1b-M269, J2, and Q. 

According to Adamov, haplogroup N1c1 makes up 94% of the Sakha population. This genetic bottleneck has been dated approximately to 1300 CE ± 200 ybp and speculated to have caused by high mortality rates in warfare and later relocation to the Middle Lena River.

The primary mitochondrial DNA haplogroups are various East Asian lineages, making up 92% of the total: haplogroup C at 36% to 45.7% and haplogroup D at 25.7% to 32.9% of the Yakut. Minor Eastern Eurasian mtDNA haplogroups include: 5.2% G, 4.49% F, 3.55% M13a1b, 1.89% A, 1.18% Y1a, 1.18% B, 0.95% Z3, and 0.71% M7. According to Fedorova, besides East Asian maternal lineages, "the mtDNA pool of the native populations of Sakha contains a small (8%), but diverse set of western Eurasian mtDNA haplogroups, mostly present among Yakuts and Evenks", the most common being H and J.

Notable people

Academia
Georgiy Basharin, professor at the Yakutsk State University 
Zoya Basharina, professor at Yakutsk State University

Arts
 Evgenia Arbugaeva, photographer

Cinema and Television
Anna Kuzmina, actress

Military
Vera Zakharova, was a Po-2 air ambulance pilot in the Soviet Air Force during World War II
Valery Kuzmin, Soviet pilot 
Fyodor Okhlopkov, was a Soviet sniper

Models
Natalya Stroeva, Miss Russia 2018

Musicians
Kjuregej, painter, actor, musician
Sarantuya, mezzo-soprano singer

Politicians
Yegor Borisov
Aysen Nikolayev
Mikhail Nikolayev

Rulers
Tygyn Darkhan, king of the Yakuts

Sports
Georgy Balakshin, boxer 
Vasilii Egorov, boxer
Pavel Pinigin, former Soviet wrestler and Olympic champion
Roman Dmitriyev, former Soviet wrestler and Olympic champion

See also
 Aisyt (Ajysyt/Ajyhyt), the name of the mythic mother goddess of the Sakha people
 Kurumchi culture
 Music in the Sakha Republic
 Turkic people
 Yakutia
 Yakut language
 Yakutian cattle

References

Bibliography

Books

Articles

Census information

Websites

Further reading
 Conolly, Violet. "The Yakuts," Problems of Communism, vol. 16, no. 5 (Sept.-Oct. 1967), pp. 81–91.
 Tomskaya, Maria. 2018. "Verbalization of Nomadic Culture in Yakut Fairytales". In: Przegląd Wschodnioeuropejski 9 (2): 253–62. https://doi.org/10.31648/pw.3210.
 Tomskaya, Maria. 2020. "Fairy Tale Images As a Component of Cultural Programming: Gender Aspect" [Сказочные образы как составляющая культурного программирования: гендерный аспект]. In: Przegląd Wschodnioeuropejski 11 (2): 145–53. https://doi.org/10.31648/pw.6497.

External links

 
Ethnic groups in Russia
Indigenous peoples of North Asia
Indigenous peoples in the Arctic
Modern nomads
Nomadic groups in Eurasia
Turkic peoples of Asia